is a 2011 Japanese comedy film directed by Yuya Ishii.

Cast
 Riisa Naka as Mitsuko
 Aoi Nakamura
 Shigeyuki Totsugi

References

External links
  
 

2011 films
2011 comedy films
Japanese comedy films
2010s Japanese-language films
Films directed by Yuya Ishii
2010s Japanese films